The Fisher Bank is a sand bank in the North Sea, off the west coast of Denmark. It consists of Great Fisher Bank, and Little Fisher Bank (the latter closer to Danish coast). Some older charts refer to them as the "Great Fishing Bank" and the "Little Fishing Bank". As Fisher it gives its name to one of the sea areas in the British Shipping Forecast.

Location
Sea area Fisher is defined by the co-ordinates:
 56°00'N 08°10'E
 56°00'N 04°00'E
 57°45'N 04°00'E
 57°45'N 07°30'E
 57°05'N 08°35'E

and the Danish coast.

Character
As its name suggests, these large sandbanks provide rich fishing grounds, but overfishing has left them less productive than they were, and many Danish fishing vessels have moved elsewhere, into the North Sea or the Baltic.

References

See also
Dogger Bank for map and links to similar places

Sandbanks of the North Sea
Shipping Forecast areas
Landforms of Denmark